DrJava is a lightweight IDE for the Java programming language. Designed primarily for beginners and actively developed and maintained by the JavaPLT group at Rice University,  its interface uses Sun Microsystems' Swing toolkit and therefore has a consistent appearance on different platforms. DrJava has the ability to interactively evaluate Java code from a console and to present output as well to the same console. It has many other features that have been designed for advanced users as well. DrJava offers a JUnit test facility.

There have been 4,332,375 downloads .

Version history
The version history of DrJava, as well as links for downloading the various versions, is maintained at SourceForge.

References

External links
 
 List of DrJava publications

Integrated development environments
Java development tools
Software using the BSD license